During the 1956–57 season, Red Star Belgrade participated in the 1956–57 Yugoslav First League, 1956–57 Yugoslav Cup, 1956 Mitropa Cup and 1956–57 European Cup.

Season summary
Red Star participated in the European Cup for the first time and were eliminated by Fiorentina in the semi-finals.

Squad

Results

Yugoslav First League

Yugoslav Cup

Mitropa Cup

European Cup

First round

Quarter-finals

Semi-finals

See also
 List of Red Star Belgrade seasons

References

Red Star Belgrade seasons
Red Star
Yugoslav football championship-winning seasons